Ilana Raviv-Oppenheim (born 1945) is a multidisciplinary artist. Her work spans a variety
of media including painting, drawing, etching, tapestry, and ceramic sculpture.

Biography
She was born in Tel Aviv in 1945 to
Itzhak and Fanya Oppenheim. The painter Moritz Daniel Oppenheim was her great-great-grand uncle. Ilana grew up in Israel.

From 1980 to 1990, she lived with her family in the
art capital of the world, New York, in order to study, renew herself, and
broaden her artistic vision. During her stay, from 1980 to 1984 she studied at the
Art Students League of New York. Among her teachers were Roberto Delamonica, Bruce Dorfman, and the American master Knox Martin.

Ilana Raviv has exhibited in various museums and
galleries of Israel, the US, Europe, and the Far East. Recently Ilana has
exhibited her works alongside the best known of artists, including Knox Martin,
Rauschenberg, Larry Rivers, Rosenquist, Chuck Close, Marisol

Work

Influences

The great mother figure from Greek mythology is among
the chief topics in her work, as are other characters from the Bible, from
history, and from literature. Her works are built from a variety of flat
designs, contrasts, and shapes, which create different versions and dimensions
of reality.

Raviv describes her works as "a metaphor which creates
and shapes an artificial life on canvas".

In 2008 she received the title of Tel Aviv–Jaffa "Woman
of the Year", representing the arts.

Her work is represented in private collections and in
various museums and galleries around the world. A solo exhibition consisting of
50 pictures by Ilana was presented at the State Russian Museum in Saint Petersburg between October 2007 and
January 2008, and another solo exhibition of 100 pictures was presented at the Moscow Museum of Modern Art. In both museums, she was the first native Israeli
to exhibit.

Besides the Russian museum exhibits, there is a Holocaust-themed
painting that has figured for many years in the permanent collection of the  Holocaust Memorial Museum in Washington DC. In this painting Ilana exposes
the monstrous aspect of the topic more than she trains a direct view on its
consequences. The painting shows the Ten Commandments consumed by flame, with
an emphasis on "Thou shalt not murder." The struggle to survive is expressed
only in the mixture of colors.

Her painting ''A Tabernacle of
Peace – Homage to Zachariah" (acrylic on canvas, 2.12 meters by 10) opened
Israel's 40th anniversary celebrations in New York at the world's largest
sukkah. Later it was displayed for eight years in the main entrance hall of the
Jerusalem International Convention Center.

Private life
Raviv is married and the mother of three. In
the course of her life she has displayed her creations at many exhibits,
including a pro bono exhibit to benefit Seeds Of Peace, which aims to 
connect Arab and Jewish youth.

References

External links
 Official Website
 AskART: Ilana Raviv
 Ilana Raviv at the Museum of Modern Art, Moscow - link number 1
 Ilana Raviv at the Museum of Modern Art, Moscow - link number 2
 Youtube - One person Show at The Museum of Modern Art Moscow
 Youtube - Ilana raviv - One person exhibition - National Arts Club at N.Y.C
 Youtube - One person show exhibition - The state Russian museum St. Petersburg
 Youtube - Ilana Raviv Oppenheim on Askimo TV
 The Holocaust Memorial Museum in Washington DC
 Profile: Art Students League of New York

1945 births
Living people
20th-century Israeli women artists
21st-century Israeli women artists
Jewish women painters
Jewish painters
Art Students League of New York alumni
Israeli Jews
Israeli women artists